Thibault Moulin (born 13 January 1990) is a French professional footballer who currently plays as a midfielder for Wieczysta Kraków.

Career
Born in Flers, he primarily plays as an attacking midfielder and was promoted to the senior team of Caen for the 2010–11 season. Moulin made his professional debut on 11 September 2010 in a league match against Auxerre. On 1 February 2011, he signed his first professional contract after agreeing to a three-year deal with Caen.

On 28 June 2013, Moulin moved to the Ligue 2 side Clermont Foot on a two-year deal.

Following the expiration of his contract with Clermont Foot, Moulin joined Belgian club Waasland-Beveren in the summer transfer market of 2015. In Belgium in his first season played 33 games(4 goals and 10 assists).
His superb appearances brought the interest of Polish club Legia Warsaw. In Poland, Moulin in his first season had 45 appearances (3 goals and 7 assists) having as a teammate PAOK winger Aleksandar Prijovic. His highlight with Legia Warsaw was a remarkable goal against giants Real Madrid, after Prijovic's assist in an UEFA Champions League. At the end of the season he won the Polish championship, being even decisive on the road to the title. In the first half of the 2017–18 season, he played in 26 games (3 goals, 1 assist).

PAOK
On 31 January 2018, just before the end of the transfer window, PAOK FC reached an agreement with Legia Warsaw for the transfer of Moulin. PAOK paid a transfer fee fee €1.3 million Moulin signing a three-year contract worth €600,000 per year.

On 17 August 2018, after making just official appearances in the domestic competitions during the second half of the 2017–18 season, Moulin joined MKE Ankaragücü on a season-long loan.

On 30 August 2019, Moulin joined Xanthi on a season-long loan.

Career statistics

Club

Honours
Legia Warsaw
Ekstraklasa: 2016–17, 2017–18
Polish Cup: 2017–18
PAOK
Greek Cup: 2017–18

References

 Francuski mózg mistrzów Polski. Kreatywny – jak chciał trener, przegladsportowy.pl, 24 June 2016

External links

 
 
 
 

Living people
Sportspeople from Orne
1990 births
Association football midfielders
French footballers
France under-21 international footballers
Ligue 1 players
Ligue 2 players
Belgian Pro League players
Ekstraklasa players
Super League Greece players
Süper Lig players
Liga I players
Stade Malherbe Caen players
LB Châteauroux players
Clermont Foot players
Legia Warsaw players
PAOK FC players
MKE Ankaragücü footballers
Xanthi F.C. players
LPS HD Clinceni players
French expatriate sportspeople in Belgium
French expatriate sportspeople in Poland
French expatriate sportspeople in Turkey
French expatriate sportspeople in Romania
Expatriate footballers in Belgium
Expatriate footballers in Poland
Expatriate footballers in Turkey
Expatriate footballers in Romania
Footballers from Normandy